Samingdam Chor.Ajalaboon, is a Thai Muay Thai fighter.

Biography and career

On October 26, 2019, Samingdam defeated Yodbuadaneg Sirilakmuaythai by decision and captured the vacant Omnoi Stadium Super Bantamweight title.

Samingdam defended his Omnoi title on July 4, 2020, against Phetsuntree Jitmuangon. He won the fight by decision.

On October 17, 2020, Samingdam defetaed Suriyanlek Aor.Bor.Tor.Kampee by decision on Jitmuangnon Fights at the Or.Tor.Gor.3 Stadium.

Samingdam entered the 2021 year having won 7 of his last 8 fights, becoming notable in the eyes of a major promotor in Kiatpetch. On October 24, 2021, Samingdam earned the biggest win of his caeer when he defeated a former Lumpinee Stadium Fighter of the Year Ronachai Tor.Ramintra at the channel 7 Stadium. The dominant decision win over a top fighter impressed the Muay Thai community. Samingdam received a 50,000 baht bonus from the P.K.Saenchai Gym owner who expressed his wish to see him compete in ONE Championship. Less than two weeks after this win the Sports Authority of Thailand announced that Samingdam was among the 6 fighters shortlisted for their prestigious Fighter of the Year award.

On January 8, 2021, Samingdam was matched with premier knee fighter Yothin FA Group at the Omnoi Stadium for the vacant IMC Featherweight title. Not considered favorite Samingdam was allowed to weigh in 2 lbs higher than his opponenent. Samingdam won by unanimous decision and solidified his position as one of the best pound-for-pound fighters in Thailand.

As of January 10, 2021 Samingdam was the #1 ranked featherweight muay thai fighter in the world by the WMO.

Titles and accomplishments
Omnoi Stadium
 2019 Omnoi Stadium 122 lbs Champion (defended once)

International Muay Thai Council 
 2021 IMC World Featherweight Champion

International Federation of Muaythai Associations
 2022 IFMA World Championships U-23 −60 kg 

Professional Boxing Association of Thailand (PAT) 
 2022 Thailand 130 lbs Champion

Awards
 2021 Channel 7 Boxing Stadium Fan favorite Fighter

Muay Thai record

|-  style="background:#cfc;"
| 2023-03-03|| Win ||align=left| Ritthidet Sor.Sommai || ONE Friday Fights 7, Lumpinee Stadium || Bangkok, Thailand || TKO (punches) || 2 ||0:11
|-  style="background:#fbb"
| 2023-01-29 || Loss ||align=left| Ronachai Tor.Ramintra  || TorNamThai Kiatpetch TKO, Rajadamnern Stadium || Bangkok, Thailand || Decision || 5 || 3:00
|-  style="background:#fbb;"
| 2022-12-19 || Loss ||align=left| TomYamGoong SorSor.Pakorn || Nakhon Phanom Super Fight + Chang Muay Thai Kiatpetch || Nakhon Phanom province, Thailand || Decision|| 5 ||3:00 

|-  style="background:#fbb;"
| 2022-10-20 ||Loss ||align=left| Sam-A Gaiyanghadao || Petchyindee, Rajadamnern Stadium || Bangkok, Thailand || Decision || 5 || 3:00

|-  style="background:#cfc;"
| 2022-08-29|| Win ||align=left| Nawaek SitChefBoontham || Muay Thai Pantamit, Thupatemi Stadium ||Bangkok, Thailand || Decision ||5  || 3:00 
|-
! style=background:white colspan=9 |
|-  style="background:#cfc;"
| 2022-07-24|| Win||align=left| Nungubon Sitchefboontham ||Channel 7 Stadium ||Bangkok, Thailand ||Decision || 5 ||3:00 
|-  style="background:#fbb;"
| 2022-05-04|| Loss ||align=left| Yothin FA Group ||Muay Thai Palangmai, Rajadamnern Stadium ||Bangkok, Thailand || Decision || 5 ||3:00 
|-  style="background:#fbb"
| 2022-02-13|| Loss ||align=left| Kompetch Sitsarawatsuer|| Channel 7 Stadium || Bangkok, Thailand || Decision || 5 || 3:00 
|-
! style=background:white colspan=9 |
|-  style="background:#cfc;"
| 2022-01-08|| Win ||align=left| Yothin FA Group || Suk Jao Muay Thai, Omnoi Stadium ||Samut Sakhon, Thailand ||Decision (Unanimous) || 5 || 3:00  
|-
! style=background:white colspan=9 |
|-  style="background:#cfc;"
| 2021-10-24|| Win ||align=left| Ronachai Tor.Ramintra || Channel 7 Stadium || Bangkok, Thailand || Decision || 5 || 3:00

|-  style="background:#cfc;"
| 2021-02-21|| Win||align=left| Petchrungruang Aodtukdang  || Channel 7 Stadium || Bangkok, Thailand || Decision || 5 || 3:00

|-  style="background:#cfc;"
| 2020-10-17|| Win ||align=left| Suriyanlek Aor.Bor.Tor.Kampee || Jitmuangnon, Or.Tor.Gor.3 Stadium || Nonthaburi, Thailand || Decision|| 5 || 3:00

|-  style="background:#cfc;"
| 2020-09-05|| Win||align=left| Detchaiya Petchyindee || Jao Muay Thai, Siam Omnoi Stadium || Bangkok, Thailand || Decision || 5 || 3:00

|-  style="background:#cfc;"
| 2020-08-01|| Win||align=left| Theptaksin Sor.Sornsing || Jao Muay Thai, Siam Omnoi Stadium || Bangkok, Thailand || Decision || 5 || 3:00

|-  style="background:#cfc;"
| 2020-07-04|| Win ||align=left| Petchsuntree Jitmuangnon || Jao Muay Thai, Omnoi Stadium || Bangkok, Thailand || Decision|| 5 || 3:00
|-
! style=background:white colspan=9 |

|-  style="background:#cfc;"
| 2020-01-28|| Win ||align=left| Phetmuangsee Aodtukdang || Tded99, Lumpinee Stadium || Bangkok, Thailand || KO (Right Elbow)|| 4 ||

|-  style="background:#fbb;"
| 2020-01-02|| Loss ||align=left| Saksit Tor.Paopiamsapaedriew || Petchyindee, Rajadamnern Stadium || Bangkok, Thailand || Decision|| 5 || 3:00

|-  style="background:#cfc;"
| 2019-11-26|| Win ||align=left| Detchaiya Petchyindee || Sukhothai, Lumpinee Stadium || Bangkok, Thailand || TKO (Referee Stoppage)|| 5 ||

|-  style="background:#cfc;"
| 2019-10-26|| Win ||align=left| Yodbuadaeng SiriliakMuaythai || Jao Muay Thai, Omnoi Stadium || Bangkok, Thailand || Decision|| 5 || 3:00
|-
! style=background:white colspan=9 |

|-  style="background:#c5d2ea;"
| 2019-09-25|| Draw||align=left| Hercules Phetsimean || Petchwittaya, Rajadamnern Stadium || Bangkok, Thailand || Decision || 5 || 3:00

|-  style="background:#fbb;"
| 2019-08-22|| Loss ||align=left| Yodkhunsuk Mor.Rajabatchombung || Sor.Sommai, Rajadamnern Stadium || Bangkok, Thailand || KO (Left hook to the body) || 2 ||

|-  style="background:#cfc;"
| 2019-07-29|| Win ||align=left| Saoek Sitchefboontham || Sor.Sommai, Rajadamnern Stadium || Bangkok, Thailand || Decision|| 5 || 3:00

|-  style="background:#fbb;"
| 2019-05-24|| Loss ||align=left| Pompetch Sor.Jor.Tongprachin || Wan Chaichana, Lumpinee Stadium || Bangkok, Thailand || Decision || 5 || 3:00

|-  style="background:#fbb;"
| 2019-04-13|| Loss ||align=left| Yodbuadaeng SiriliakMuaythai || Jao Muay Thai, Omnoi Stadium || Bangkok, Thailand || Decision|| 5 || 3:00

|-  style="background:#fbb;"
| 2019-02-27|| Loss ||align=left| Peankon Diamond98 || Petchchaopraya, Rajadamnern Stadium || Bangkok, Thailand || Decision|| 5 || 3:00

|-  style="background:#cfc;"
| 2018-12-20|| Win ||align=left| Yodkhunsuk Mor.Rajabatchombung || Sor.Sommai, Rajadamnern Stadium || Bangkok, Thailand || Decision || 5 || 3:00

|-  style="background:#cfc;"
| 2018-11-29|| Win||align=left| Peankon Diamond98 || Sor.Sommai, Rajadamnern Stadium || Bangkok, Thailand || Decision|| 5 || 3:00

|-  style="background:#cfc;"
| 2018-10-18|| Win||align=left| Phetseemok P.K.Saenchaimuaythaigym || Sor.Sommai, Rajadamnern Stadium || Bangkok, Thailand || Decision || 5 || 3:00
 
|-  style="background:#fbb;"
| 2018-09-12|| Loss ||align=left| Somraknoi Muay789 || Tor.Chaiwat, Rajadamnern Stadium || Bangkok, Thailand || Decision|| 5 || 3:00

|-  style="background:#cfc;"
| 2018-08-11 || Win ||align=left| Yodbuadaeng SiriliakMuaythai || Jao Muay Thai, Omnoi Stadium || Bangkok, Thailand || Decision|| 5 || 3:00

|-  style="background:#fbb;"
| 2018-07-19|| Loss ||align=left| Saotho Sitchefboontham || Rajadamnern Stadium || Bangkok, Thailand || Decision || 5 || 3:00

|-  style="background:#cfc;"
| 2018-05-07|| Win ||align=left| Rajasee IT2000 || Bangrachan, Rajadamnern Stadium || Bangkok, Thailand || Decision || 5 || 3:00

|-  style="background:#cfc;"
| 2018-04-05|| Win ||align=left| Kedkaw Nawyandaman || Sor.Sommai, Rajadamnern Stadium || Bangkok, Thailand || Decision || 5 || 3:00

|-  style="background:#fbb;"
| 2018-03-14|| Loss ||align=left| Saoek Sitchefboontham || Tor.Chaiwat, Rajadamnern Stadium || Bangkok, Thailand || Decision|| 5 || 3:00

|-  style="background:#cfc;"
| 2018-02-03|| Win ||align=left| Kumantong Jitmuangnon || Jao Muay Thai, Omnoi Stadium || Bangkok, Thailand || Decision || 5 || 3:00

|-  style="background:#cfc;"
| 2018-01-08|| Win ||align=left| Phetsukumwit Or.Daokrajai|| Jitmuangnon, Rajadamnern Stadium || Bangkok, Thailand || Decision || 5 || 3:00

|-  style="background:#cfc;"
| 2017-12-18|| Win ||align=left| Suemit Sursuraj|| Bangrachan, Rajadamnern Stadium || Bangkok, Thailand || TKO (Right Elbow)|| 2 ||

|-  style="background:#cfc;"
| 2017-11-26|| Win ||align=left| Kaipayak Chor.Hapayak||  Muay Dee Vithithai, Rangsit Stadium || Rangsit, Thailand || Decision || 5 || 3:00

|-  style="background:#fbb;"
| 2017-08-30|| Loss ||align=left| Yodmanoot Pumphanmuang || Sor.Sommai, Rajadamnern Stadium || Bangkok, Thailand || KO (Knee to the body) || 3 ||

|-  style="background:#fbb;"
| 2017-07-19|| Loss ||align=left| Nuengpichit PetchparaAcademy || Sor.Sommai, Rajadamnern Stadium || Bangkok, Thailand || Decision || 5 || 3:00

|-  style="background:#cfc;"
| 2017-06-17|| Win ||align=left| Komphetlek Sor.Jor.Motree|| Jao Muay Thai, Omnoi Stadium || Bangkok, Thailand || TKO (Referee Stoppage) || 4 ||

|-  style="background:#fbb;"
| 2017-05-15|| Loss ||align=left| Messi Pangkongprab|| Sor.Sommai, Rajadamnern Stadium || Bangkok, Thailand || Decision || 5 || 3:00

|-  style="background:#cfc;"
| 2017-04-10|| Win ||align=left| Ken Mor.Andaman|| Petchchaopraya, Rajadamnern Stadium || Bangkok, Thailand || Decision || 5 || 3:00

|-  style="background:#cfc;"
| 2017-03-17|| Win ||align=left| Kompayak Phetchaopraya|| Sangmorakot, Lumpinee Stadium || Bangkok, Thailand || Decision || 5 || 3:00

|-  style="background:#cfc;"
| 2017-02-15|| Win ||align=left| Phethevada B.S.J.Sungnoen|| Chujaroen, Rajadamnern Stadium || Bangkok, Thailand || Decision || 5 || 3:00

|-  style="background:#cfc;"
| 2017-01-23|| Win ||align=left| Nawaek Sitchefboontham|| Chujaroen, Rajadamnern Stadium || Bangkok, Thailand || Decision || 5 || 3:00

|-  style="background:#fbb;"
| 2016-11-24|| Loss ||align=left| Rajasee IT2000 || Bangrachan, Rajadamnern Stadium || Bangkok, Thailand || KO (Straight Left)|| 3 ||

|-  style="background:#fbb;"
| 2016-09-29|| Loss ||align=left| Addum Teeded 99 || Sor.Sommai, Rajadamnern Stadium || Bangkok, Thailand || Decision|| 5 || 3:00

|-  style="background:#cfc;"
| 2016-09-07|| Win ||align=left| Sangdaw Phetsimuen || Bangrachan, Rajadamnern Stadium || Bangkok, Thailand || TKO || 3 ||

|-  style="background:#cfc;"
| 2016-08-09|| Win ||align=left| Nampongnoi Sor.Sommai || Phetwiset, Rajadamnern Stadium || Bangkok, Thailand || Decision || 5 || 3:00

|-  style="background:#cfc;"
| 2016-07-17|| Win ||align=left| Phetsinin Sitboonmee  || Rajadamnern Stadium || Bangkok, Thailand || Decision || 5 || 3:00

|-  style="background:#cfc;"
| 2016-06-23|| Win ||align=left| Sanit Paesaysi || Petchchaopraya, Rajadamnern Stadium || Bangkok, Thailand || TKO || 3 ||

|-  style="background:#fbb;"
| 2016-05-08|| Loss ||align=left| Phetchnadoon NanthipatKonsong|| Rajadamnern Stadium || Bangkok, Thailand || Decision|| 5 || 3:00

|-  style="background:#cfc;"
| 2015-10-31|| Win ||align=left| Phetnamun Sor.Thanabowon || Krikkrai, Lumpinee Stadium || Bangkok, Thailand || TKO || 3 ||

|-  style="background:#fbb;"
| 2015-08-23|| Loss ||align=left| Chamuakphet Sor.Trakruthong || Muay Dee Vithithai, Rangsit Stadium || Bangkok, Thailand || Decision|| 5 || 3:00

|-  style="background:#cfc;"
| 2015-07-04|| Win ||align=left| Timchai Nuysimunmuang || Krikkrai, Lumpinee Stadium || Bangkok, Thailand || TKO || 5 ||

|-  style="background:#cfc;"
| 2015-06-06|| Win ||align=left| Montien Sitmonchai || Krikkrai, Lumpinee Stadium || Bangkok, Thailand || TKO || 3 ||

|-
| colspan=9 | Legend:    

|-  style="background:#cfc;"
| 2022-06-03|| Win ||align=left| Davlatshokh Shamsiev || IFMA World Championships 2022, Final|| Abu Dhabi, United Arab Emirates || Decision (Split) ||3  ||3:00
|-
! style=background:white colspan=9 |

|-  style="background:#cfc;"
| 2022-06-01|| Win ||align=left| Mohsen Alsibyani || IFMA World Championships 2022, Semi Finals|| Abu Dhabi, United Arab Emirates || TKO (retirement)|| 2 || 

|-  style="background:#cfc;"
| 2022-05-31|| Win ||align=left| Adrien Sautron || IFMA  World Championships 2022, Quarter Finals|| Abu Dhabi, United Arab Emirates || TKO (retirement)|| 2 || 

|-  style="background:#cfc;"
| 2022-05-29|| Win||align=left| Vladislav Petrosyan || IFMA World Championships 2022, Second Round|| Abu Dhabi, United Arab Emirates || Decision (Unanimous) || 3 ||3:00 

|-
| colspan=9 | Legend:

References

Living people
Samingdam Chor.Ajalaboon
1999 births
Samingdam Chor.Ajalaboon